Painesville is a disused railroad depot in Painesville, Ohio. It was opened in 1893 to replace an older depot on the same line. The depot is located on Railroad Street. The depot is currently used as a railroad museum.

History
July 1892 - Groundbreaking of the new  Lake Shore depot.

February 1, 1893 - Station opens

May 1971 - Passenger service to Painesville Depot had stopped, the depot became a Greyhound Bus station until about mid 1988.

1988 - Conrail used the depot for storing signals and equipment.

1997 - The Western Reserve Railroad Association was formed to help save this historic landmark.

2002 - Ohio Historical Maker awarded

2015 - City of Painesville makes Railroad Street and Depot a Historic District.

2017 - Railroad museum opens

References

External links 
LAKE COUNTY Railroad Depots

Railway stations in the United States opened in 1893
Former railway stations in Ohio
Former New York Central Railroad stations
Railway stations closed in 1971
1893 establishments in Ohio
1971 disestablishments in Ohio